is a Japanese voice actress and singer from Miyagi Prefecture. She attended voice actor training classes of the Avex Artist Academy before becoming affiliated with Avex Planning and Development. She is known for her role as Megumi Katō in the anime series Saekano: How to Raise a Boring Girlfriend. In 2016, she became part of the musical unit Walküre, which performs songs for the anime series Macross Delta. She made her music debut in 2017 with the release of the mini-album .

Biography
Yasuno was born in Miyagi Prefecture on July 9, 1989. About a week after she was born, her family moved to Hakodate, and after some time they moved back to Miyagi Prefecture. From an early age, she had an interest in anime, particularly after watching Sailor Moon and Magic Knight Rayearth as a child. She became aware of voice acting at a young age, while watching the anime series Saint Tail. To further her interest, she watched videos of dubs being recorded.

During her sixth year of elementary school, Yasuno moved to Tokyo. In high school, she became part of her school's theater club. Although she had been looking for a voice acting school, her parents told her that they would allow her to pursue a voice acting career only if she paid with her own money. Around that time, the talent agency Avex was holding auditions for its voice acting school, so she decided to apply. She passed the audition and began attending voice acting school. She played a number of background roles in anime beginning in 2009, and in 2011 played her first lead role as Kizuna Todoroki, the protagonist of the anime Kizuna Ichigake, which was produced as part of the Young Animator Training Project.

Yasuno continued voicing primarily supporting roles until 2013, when she was cast as the character Sakura Kitaōji in the multimedia franchise Aikatsu! The following year, she played the roles of Tina Kobayakawa in Wake Up, Girls! and Yuko Tachikawa in Parasyte. In 2015, she was cast as Megumi Katō, the main heroine of the anime series Saekano: How to Raise a Boring Girlfriend. That year, she also voiced Kaori Murasaki in Triage X and Mayuko Inoue in Ushio and Tora. In 2015, she joined the popular idol multimedia franchise iDOLM@STER, taking on the role of  THE iDOLM@STER CINDERELLA GIRLS character Natsuki Kimura and has attended many of the franchise's live concerts to represent the character.

In 2016, Yasuno became part of the musical unit Walküre, which performed songs in the anime series Macross Delta; she also played the role of Kaname Buccaneer in the series. She also played the roles of Cordelia Kasukami in Twin Star Exorcists, Botan Kumegawa in Anne Happy, and Gretel Jeckeln in Schwarzesmarken. In 2017, she released her first mini-album  under the FlyingDog label; the mini-album includes the song , which was used as the closing theme to the anime series Restaurant to Another World. She made appearances at Anime Festival Asia Singapore in November 2017 and C3 AFA Hong Kong in February 2018. She made an appearance at Anime North in Toronto on May 25, 2018 to May 27, 2018 where she held a signing session as well as a Q&A panel.

Filmography

Television animation
2009
Fight Ippatsu! Jūden-chan!!, Friend B
2010
Chu-Bra!!, Itagaki, Female student
2011
Un-Go, An Osada
Chihayafuru, Rika Mashima
No. 6, Safu
Pokémon: Black & White, Rina
2012
Aquarion Evol, Shushu
Nakaimo - My Sister Is Among Them!, Friend
Soreike! Anpanman, Aoenpitsuman, Mizu no Ko B
High School DxD, Meguri
Bodacious Space Pirates, Asta Alhanko
2013 
Aikatsu!, Sakura Kitaōji, Shizuku Hosaka
Valvrave the Liberator, Iori Kitagawa
Oshiri Kajiri Mushi, Nise Kajiri, Z mother, Health room teacher
The Severing Crime Edge, Kashiko Misumi 
Soreike! Anpanman, Yukidaruman, Girl, Sakuranbo A
Chihayafuru 2, Hinako Mano, Megumi Mayama
Da Capo III, Nomiya Ebisu
Valvrave the Liberator 2nd Season, Iori Kitagawa

Pokémon: XY, Cosette
Pocket Monsters: Best Wishes! Season 2: Decolora Adventure, Ayumi
2014
Wake Up, Girls!, Tina Kobayakawa
When Supernatural Battles Became Commonplace, Assistant
Parasyte, Yuko Tachikawa
Monthly Girls' Nozaki-kun, Heroine, Schoolgirl, Clerk

Pokémon: XY, Espurr, Pichu
Hamatora: the Animation, Koneko
Yo-Kai Watch, Chi-chan, Matenshi
Re:_Hamatora, Koneko
2015
Danchi Tomoo, Yūko
Saekano: How to Raise a Boring Girlfriend, Megumi Katō

PriPara, Anko
Show by Rock!!, Wendy
Triage X, Kaori Murasaki
Ushio and Tora, Mayuko Inoue
Gatchaman Crowds insight, Erina Kido, Housewife
The Idolmaster Cinderella Girls 2nd Season, Natsuki Kimura
2016
Schwarzesmarken, Gretel Jeckeln
Anne Happy, Botan Kumegawa
Macross Delta, Kaname Buccaneer
Twin Star Exorcists, Cordelia Kasukami
2017
Saekano: How to Raise a Boring Girlfriend Flat, Megumi Kato
Restaurant to Another World, Sarah Gold
Kirakira PreCure a la Mode, Lumière
Black Clover, Charmy Pappitson
2018
 Death March to the Parallel World Rhapsody, Nana
Overlord II, Princess Renner 
My Hero Academia, Nejire Hado
2019

 Saekano the Movie: Finale, Megumi Kato

Star☆Twinkle PreCure, Elena Amamiya / Cure Soleil
Are You Lost?, Mutsu Amatani
Didn't I Say to Make My Abilities Average in the Next Life?!, Monika
2020
Kakushigoto, Rasuna Sumita
Arte, Dacha
2021
Dragon Quest: The Adventure of Dai, Marin
Edens Zero, Witch Regret
The Aquatope on White Sand, Akari Maeda
"Deji" Meets Girl, Maise Higa
Restaurant to Another World 2, Sarah Gold
2022
Slow Loop, Tora Yoshinaga
Orient, Michiru Saruwatari
Arknights: Prelude to Dawn, Hoshiguma

Theatrical animation
Kizuna Ichigeki (2011), Kizuna Todoroki
Aikatsu! (2014), Sakura Kitaōji
Bodacious Space Pirates: Abyss of Hyperspace (2014), Asta Alhanko
Wake Up, Girls! – Seven Idols (2014), Tina Kobayakawa
Macross Delta: Gekijou no Walküre (2018), Kaname Buccaneer
Saekano the Movie: Finale (2019), Megumi Katō
PreCure Miracle Universe (2019), Erena Amamiya / Cure Soleil
Aria the Crepusculo (2021), Aletta

Video games
The Idolmaster Cinderella Girls Starlight Stage (2015-current), Natsuki Kimura
Granblue Fantasy (2016), Pamela
Uta Macross Sma-Pho De-Culture (2017), Kaname Buccaneer
Food Fantasy (2018), Pineapple Bun, Bird's Nest Soup
Azur Lane (2019), IJN Azuma
My Hero: One's Justice 2 (2020), Nejire Hado
Arknights (2020), Hoshiguma
Lord of Heroes (2020), Baretta
Wing of Darkness (2021), Klara
Echoes of Mana (2022), Sierra

Dubbing
Pac-Man and the Ghostly Adventures, Pinky, Braces Strictler
Surf's Up 2: WaveMania, Lani Aliikai

Discography

Mini album

Single

References

External links

 Official blog 
 Official agency profile 
 Official agency Fanclub 

1989 births
Living people
Anime singers
Japanese video game actresses
Japanese voice actresses
Musicians from Miyagi Prefecture
Voice actors from Hakodate
Voice actresses from Hokkaido
Voice actresses from Miyagi Prefecture